The Association of the Universities of Asia and the Pacific (AUAP) is a platform and voices of universities in Asia and the Pacific and around the world. AUAP is a Non-Governmental Organization (NGO), holding the highest formal consultative status with UNESCO. Its primary purpose is to be the main platform for interaction and collaboration between members, and to be the effective voice of universities in Asia and the Pacific region. AUAP organizes regular conferences  and workshops for higher education leaders and institutions in the Asia-Pacific region to discuss important issues and the challenges facing higher education.  The association promotes and helps enhance mutually beneficial cooperation among educational institutions, and is dedicated to render such services to its member institutions.

History and overview
The Association of Universities of Asia and the Pacific, ( AUAP). This organization is based in Thailand and it was established in 1995. It serves as a platform for cooperation among colleges and universities in Asia, the Pacific and around the world. AUAP has numerous activities such as conferences, seminars, academic and sports activities for the students. AUAP was established in 1995 as a non-government organization. It is an aggrupation of university chief executives from higher education institutions in Asia, the Pacific, and around the world. One of the main purposes of AUAP are: to promote a culture of quality and innovation in higher education, research and service to the community and to be the voice of universities in Asia and the Pacific. At the moment it has over 150 active members. It also has consultation rights with UNESCO.

Mission
 To promote a culture of quality, innovation and research in the higher education sectors in the Asia and the Pacific region.
 To preserve and enhance the values and cultural diversity of Asia and the Pacific towards better understanding and cooperation for socio-economic development and (universal) peace.
 To engage with stakeholders of the higher educations and other organizations to further the objectives of AUAP.
 To maintain a platform for interaction and collaboration among members, and be the voice of universities in Asia and the Pacific region.
 To promote universal peace and international understanding through education.

List of presidents
 Professor Dr. Wichit Srisa-an (Thailand) - 28 July 1995 – 8 December 1997
 Professor Dr. Donald McNicol (Australia)- 9 December 1997 – 24 November 1999
 Dr. Emmanuel Y. Angeles (Philippines) -25  November 1999 – 22 October 2001
 Professor Dr. Li Jian Shi (China)  -23     October 2001 – 13 March 2002
 Dr. Shuping Chen (China) -13     May 2002 – 9 October 2003
 Dr. Chugwon Choue (South Korea) -10     October 2003 – 28 March 2004
 Professor Dr. Wibisono Hardjopranoto        (Indonesia)-29     arch 2004-21 October 2006
 Professor Dr. Iu Vai Pan ( Macau) -22     October 2009 – 7 November 2008
 Dr. Carmen Z. Lamagna (Bangladesh)- 8 November 2008 – 7 November 2010
 Professor Dr. Prasat Suebka (Thailand)-    8 November 2010 – 4 December 2012
 Professor Tan Sri Dato’ Wira  Dr. Sharifah Hapsah Syed Hasan Shahabudin (Malaysia)- 5 December 2012 – 6 November 2013
 Professor Datuk Dr. Noor Azlen Ghazali-  7 November 2013 – 14 November 2014
 Dr. Shawn C. Chen (China)-  15 November 2014 – 31 December 2016
 Dr. Sunghee Nam (South Korea)-  1 January 2017-  18 November 2018  
 Professor Dr. Mahmud Nili Ahmadabadi ( Iran) - January 1, 2019- December 31, 2020
 Dr. Peter P. Laurel (Philippines) - January 1, 2021  - December 31, 2022
 Dr Md Sabur Khan (Bangladesh) - Effective From January 1, 2023  - December 31, 2024

See also
List of higher education associations and alliances

References

Educational organizations